Pycnadenoides is a genus of trematodes in the family Opecoelidae.

Species
Pycnadenoides calami Manter, 1947
Pycnadenoides ghanensis Fischthal & Thomas, 1968
Pycnadenoides invenustus Aken'Ova, 2003
Pycnadenoides pagrosomi Yamaguti, 1938
Pycnadenoides reversati Aken'Ova, 2003
Pycnadenoides senegalensis Fischthal & Thomas, 1972
Pycnadenoides umbrinae (Stossich, 1885) Gibson & Bray, 1988

References

Opecoelidae
Plagiorchiida genera